Idjit Savant is the fifth studio album by punk rock band The Dickies. It was released in 1995 on Triple X Records. It was jokingly referred to by singer Leonard Graves Phillips as their "best album no one's ever heard".

Although bass player Charlie Alexander played on most of the album's tracks, his sudden departure just weeks before a tour upset Phillips, and replacement Marc Vachon was credited in the liner notes instead.

The track "Just Say Yes" had already been released as a single in 1990.

Track listing

Credits 
The Dickies

 Leonard Graves Phillips – lead vocals, keyboards
 Stan Lee – guitar
 Glen Laughlin - guitar, backing vocals, mandolin
 Marc Vachon – bass
 Jonathan Melvoin – drums, percussion

Additional Musicians:

 Charlie Alexander - bass on "Zeppelina", "Elevator...", "Pretty Ballerina", "Make it so", "Oh Boy!" and "House of Raoul"
 Laurie Buhne - bass on "Just say Yes" and "Roadkill"
 Cliff Martinez - drums on "Just say Yes" and "Roadkill"
 Enoch Hain - guitar on "Welcome To The Diamond Mine", "Golden Boys", "Toxic Avenger", "I'm Stuck In A Condo (With Marlon Brando)", "Just say Yes" and "Roadkill"
Michael Acosta - saxophone on "House of Raoul"
Daoud Coleman - cello on "Pretty Ballerina" 
Roger Manning - harpsichord on "Pretty Ballerina"

Production

 Recorded at Cal State Dominguez Hills, Tiny Lights Recording, Jandemonium and Sonora
 Produced by The Dickies and John X
 Engineered by John X, Pat Kraus and Brian Kehew
 Mastered by Dan Hersch
 Cover Art by Philip Aro

References 

1994 albums
The Dickies albums